Shapland Carew  was an Irish politician.

Carew was born in Wexford and educated at  Trinity College, Dublin.

Carew represented  Waterford City from 1748 to 1761; and again from 1769 to 1776 in the Irish Parliament.

References

People from Wexford, County Wexford
Irish MPs 1727–1760
Irish MPs 1769–1776
Members of the Parliament of Ireland (pre-1801) for County Waterford constituencies
Alumni of Trinity College Dublin